The List Burgenland (LBL) is a political party in Austria, operating in the federal state of Burgenland. It was founded in 2010 with support of the Free Citizens' List (FBL).

At the 2010 state election, the List Burgenland got 4.0% of the popular vote and 1 out of 36 seats. They increased their proportion of the vote to 4.8% at the next election, winning 2 seats.

In the 2020 state election, the party lost both its 2 seats partially due to the Ibiza-gate scandal which had negatively impacted right wing party support.

Election results

References

External links
 Official website
 Freie Bürgerliste - FBL

Political parties in Austria
Political parties established in 2010
2010 establishments in Austria
Freedom Party of Austria breakaway groups